National Tertiary Route 318, or just Route 318 (or ) is a National Road Route of Costa Rica, located in the San José, Puntarenas provinces.

Description
In San José province the route covers Puriscal canton (Chires district).

In Puntarenas province the route covers Parrita canton (Parrita district).

References

Highways in Costa Rica